The Arroscia is an Italian river in the provinces of Imperia. and Savona.

Geography 
The river rises from monte Frontè, in the comune of Mendatica, not far from the French border. The Arroscia flows east and receives several tributaries. It then joins the Neva and forms with it the Centa, one of the most relevant rivers of western Liguria.

Main tributaries 

 Right hand:
 rio Ponte,
 rio Ravinasso, 
 rio Rocchino,
 torrente Giara di Rezzo,
 rio Bottasso, 
 rio Ubaga.
 torrente Lerrone.
 Left hand:
 rio Gropin, 
 dei Laghi,
 rio Brignola,
 rio Teglia,
 torrente Arogna,
 rio Varasce, 
 rio Cornareo.
 rio Parone,
 rio Merco.

References

See also

 List of rivers of Italy

Rivers of Italy
Rivers of Liguria
Rivers of the Province of Imperia
Rivers of the Province of Savona
Tributaries of the Centa
Rivers of the Alps